Pechipogo strigilata, the common fan-foot, is a moth of the family Noctuidae. It was described by Carl Linnaeus in 1758. It is found throughout Europe to the Urals then east across the Palearctic to Siberia, Amur, Ussuri, Korea and Japan.

Technical description and variation

Its forewings are ochreous dusted very densely with yellow brown; a slight dark cell mark; inner and outer lines brownish, more or less parallel, the inner curved in cell, the outer more widely beyond it; subterminal line oblique; hindwing with costal area pale, without markings; a faint outer line; subterminal dark, externally edged with pale.

Biology
The moth flies from late May until early July.

Larvae are dull reddish ochreous, with dorsal, subdorsal, and lateral rows of dark freckled diamond-shaped marks; head fuscous. The larvae feed on dead, decaying leaves of oak, alder and birch.

References

External links

"Pechipogo strigilata (Linnaeus, 1758)". Fauna Europaea. Retrieved 11 July 2020.
"08852 Pechipogo strigilata (Linnaeus, 1758) - Bart-Spannereule". Lepiforum e. V. Retrieved 11 July 2020. 
"Baardsnuituil Pechipogo strigilata". De Vlinderstichting. Retrieved 11 July 2020. 

Moths described in 1758
Moths of Japan
Moths of Europe
Noctuidae
Taxa named by Carl Linnaeus